Ramakrishna Mission Vidyalaya, Coimbatore, is an educational centre of Ramakrishna Mission. It is 19 km from Coimbatore City on the highway to Ootacamund, and is situated in an environment spread over about 300 acres. The Institution was founded by Sri T.S. Avinashilingam in 1930 with an investment of just Rs. 5.75 and with one harijan boy on its roll.
Mahatma Gandhi laid the foundation stone of the Vidyalaya in 1934. The Vidyalaya was affiliated to Ramakrishna Mission in the same year.

The public celebration of the birthday of Bhagavan Sri Ramakrishna, popularly known as Guru Puja, is the most important annual cultural activity of the Vidyalaya. The day-long celebration, observed on the first Sunday of every year, includes bhajans, talks by eminent personalities, drama, educational exhibition, music and cultural programmes. The highlight of the function is the Maheswara Puja, i.e. feeding of about 10,000 people at noon.

The Sri Ramakrishna Mission Vidyalaya Polytechnic College was founded in 1956 as a wing of the Rural Institute, called the School of Engineering, under the National Council for Rural Higher Education. It is an institution of the Ramakrishna Mission Vidyalaya In 1974, the Institute was affiliated to the State Board of Technical Education and Training, Government of Tamil Nadu. In 2010 the Polytechnic was certified as an ISO 9001 2000 institute.

Courses 
 Diploma In Information Technology
 Diploma In Civil Engineering
 Diploma In Mechanical Engineering
 Diploma In Electrical and Electronics Engineering

References 

Universities and colleges in Coimbatore
Educational institutions established in 1930
Universities and colleges affiliated with the Ramakrishna Mission
1930 establishments in India